The fifth season of Designing Women premiered on CBS on September 17, 1990, and concluded on May 13, 1991. The season consisted of 24 episodes. Created by Linda Bloodworth-Thomason, the series was produced by Bloodworth/Thomason Mozark Productions in association with Columbia Pictures Television.

Cast

Main cast
 Dixie Carter as Julia Sugarbaker
 Annie Potts as Mary Jo Shively
 Delta Burke as Suzanne Sugarbaker
 Jean Smart as Charlene Frazier-Stillfield
 Meshach Taylor as Anthony Bouvier

Recurring cast
 Alice Ghostley as Bernice Clifton
 Michael Goldfinger as Rusty
 Douglas Barr as Colonel Bill Stillfield
 Priscilla Weems as Claudia Shively
 Richard Gilliland as J.D. Shackleford
 Lexi Randall as Randa Oliver
 Brian Lando as Quinton Shively

Guest cast

 Mary Ann Mobley as Karen Delaporte
 Kristoffer Tabori as Daryl Morton
 Bill Cobbs as Henry/Charlie
 Charles Levin as Marvin Sheinberg
 Meg Wyllie as Miss Eulalie Crown
 Sandahl Bergman as Davida Daniels
 Richard Sanders as Dr. Elliot Newhouse

 Peter Crook as Bill
 Collin Bernsen as Donald Banks
 Dennis Burkley as Billy Boy Swine
 Patricia Ayame Thomson as May
 Darrell Larson as Garret Rossler
 Dennis Burkley as Buford

Episodes

DVD release
The fifth season was released on DVD by Shout! Factory on December 6, 2011.

References

External links
 

Designing Women seasons
1990 American television seasons
1991 American television seasons